Alexander Mojžiš (born 2 January 1999) is a Slovak professional footballer who currently plays for Fortuna Liga club Ružomberok as a defender.

Club career

FK Železiarne Podbrezová
Mojžiš made his Fortuna Liga debut for Železiarne Podbrezová against ViOn Zlaté Moravce on 19 May 2018 in a 1:0 home win. He played the entire match.

International career
Mojžiš was first recognised in Slovak senior national team nomination on 16 March 2022 by Štefan Tarkovič as an alternate ahead of two international friendly fixtures against Norway and Finland and repeated the same recognition ahead of four scheduled competitive UEFA Nations League fixtures in June. Following Tarkovič's dismissal, Mojžiš was first shortlisted in a nomination by Francesco Calzona, who joined the side in late summer, for senior national team prospective players' training camp at NTC Senec.

Personal life
Alexander has twin brother Viktor who plays for amateur team of Partizán Osrblie.

References

External links
 FK Železiarne Podbrezová official club profile 
 
 Futbalnet profile 
 

1999 births
Living people
Sportspeople from Krupina
Slovak footballers
Slovakia under-21 international footballers
Association football defenders
FK Železiarne Podbrezová players
MFK Ružomberok players
2. Liga (Slovakia) players
Slovak Super Liga players